Jorge González Prado (born 23 May 1995) is a Colombian footballer who plays for S.C. Olhanense as a striker.

References

External links
FPF Profile

1995 births
Living people
Association football wingers
Colombian footballers
S.C. Olhanense players
Colombian expatriate footballers
Expatriate footballers in Portugal